Jean Bessems  (born 4 January 1945) is a former professional Dutch carom and artistic billiards player. Bessems won the Artistic Billiards World Championship in 1985 and 1988, and finished as runner-up in 1984.

Career 
Jean Bessems was born in Cadier en Keer, a district of Margraten, today Eijsden-Margraten in January 1945. His father was a farmer, pigeon breeder and later cafe owner. At the age of 14 he started playing billiards, and also played football. Aged 19, Bessem had to decide between billiards and football, choosing to no longer play football. Bessems played first Carom billiards, but later switched to artistic billiards, more commonly associated with trickshots.

Bessems made his international breakthrough in 1965 at the European Youth Billiards Championships. In the Cadre 47/2 European Championship 1971 in Nice, he won his first silver medal in the men's competition. He won the Artistic Billiards World Championship event both in 1985, held in Sluis in Zeeland and again in 1988 in Stockerau in Austria. Bessems was also a four time European Artistic Billiards champion, winning the event in 1986, 1987, 1988, and 1989. In 1991 he finished his sporting career and 2005 went into early retirement.

Personal life 
Bessems worked as a mechanical engineer. For twenty years, like his father, he was a passionate pigeon breeder.

Achievements
International 
 Artistic Billiards World Championship: 
 winner: 1985, 1988
runner-up: 1984 
third place: 1987
 Cadre-47/1 World Championship: 
runner-up:1975
 Artistic Billiards European Championships: 
winner: 1986, 1987, 1988, 1989
runner-up: 1985 
third place: 1981, 1982, 1983
 Cadre-47/1 European Championships: (runner-up) 1975
 Cadre-47/2 European Championships: (runner-up) 1971
 Cadre-71/2 European Championships: (third place) 1974

National

 Dutch Artistic Championships 
winner:1981, 1982, 1983, 1984, 1985, 1986, 1987, 1989
 Dutch Cadre Championships:
winner: 1 × 47/2, 1 × 47/1, 3 × 71/2
 Dutch Pentathlon Championships: 
runner-up: 1973 
third place: 1975

References

External links 
 
 
 

1945 births
Dutch carom billiards players
Living people